Tyndale Christian School, founded in 1983 by like minded parents who employed Roy Magor to be the first Headmaster, is a coeducational private R-12 school located in Salisbury East, South Australia, Australia. The school is named after William Tyndale, who translated the Bible into the Early Modern English language. Michael Potter is the second and current principal of the school.

Sub-schools
As of 2010 the school has over 1300 students enrolled to one of three sub-schools:
 Junior School (R-5)
 Middle School (6-9)
 Senior School (10-12)
Considered a cheaper more affordable school for Christian families to send their children to.

Prior to 2001 the school had Primary (R-7) and High (8-12) sub-schools.

In recent years few more additions have been made to the campus including a new area called 'The Zone' for special needs children to work with more supervision effectively

References

External links 
 School website
 Solar Energy Generation
 https://www.tyndale.edu.au/enrolment/fees
 http://www.greenwayarchitects.com.au/tyndale-christian-school-new-special-education-centre/

High schools in South Australia
Private schools in South Australia
Nondenominational Christian schools in South Australia
Educational institutions established in 1983
1983 establishments in Australia